Aṭ-Ṭaībah is one of the districts  of Irbid governorate, Jordan.

References

External Links
Photos of Tayyiba at the American Center of Research

 
Districts of Jordan